Kodibail  is a village in Uppala town, Kasaragod district, Kerala, India. It is in the south west region of Uppala.

Transportation
Local roads have access to National Highway No.66 which connects to Mangalore in the north and Calicut in the south.  The nearest railway station is Manjeshwar on Mangalore-Palakkad line. There is an airport at Mangalore.

Languages
This locality is an essentially multi-lingual region. The people speak Malayalam, Urdu and Tulu.

Administration
This village is part of Manjeswaram assembly constituency which is again part of Kasaragod (Lok Sabha constituency)

References

Manjeshwar area